Brian Dunn may refer to:
 Brian Joseph Dunn (born 1955), Canadian Roman Catholic bishop
 Brian J. Dunn, American businessman from Minnesota
 Brian Dunn (tennis) (born 1974), American tennis player from Florida